Quality Comics was an American comic book publishing company which operated from 1937 to 1956 and was a creative, influential  force in what historians and fans call the Golden Age of Comic Books.

Notable, long-running titles published by Quality include Blackhawk, Feature Comics, G.I. Combat, Heart Throbs, Military Comics/Modern Comics, Plastic Man, Police Comics, Smash Comics, and The Spirit. While most of their titles were published by a company named Comic Magazines, from 1940 onwards all publications bore a logo that included the word "Quality". Notable creators associated with the company included Jack Cole, Reed Crandall, Will Eisner, Lou Fine, Gill Fox, Paul Gustavson, Bob Powell, and Wally Wood.

History
Quality Comics was founded by Everett M. "Busy" Arnold, a printer who saw the rapidly rising popularity of the comic book medium in the late 1930s. Deducing that Depression-era audiences wanted established quality and familiar comic strips for their hard-earned dimes, in 1937 the enterprising Arnold, formed the suitably titled Comic Favorites, Inc. (in collaboration with three newspaper syndicates: the McNaught Syndicate, the Frank J. Markey Syndicate, and Iowa's Register and Tribune Syndicate).

Comic Favorites, Inc.'s first publication was Feature Funnies, which began primarily with color reprints of hit strips from all three co-owning syndicates (including Joe Palooka, Mickey Finn, and Dixie Dugan [all three from McNaught]) alongside a small number of original features. The original material came from various sources, including the company's in-house staff and/or freelancers (from the first issue) and the Eisner & Iger shop (from issue #3).

A frequent point of confusion is whether and how comic packaging shop Harry "A" Chesler was involved with the company's early days. Several sources list Chesler as the publisher of Feature Funnies, but the only primary source to mention Chesler is an interview with Arnold in which he describes purchasing content from the shop for Military Comics and Police Comics, neither of which began until 1941. An interview with Will Eisner quoted in The Quality Companion indicates that Arnold was not always an owner of Comic Favorites, Inc., but the authors of that reference were unable to find any corroborating evidence amidst a large volume of evidence to the contrary.

In 1939, Arnold and the owners of the Register & Tribune Syndicate's parent company, brothers John Cowles, Sr. and Gardner Cowles, Jr., bought out the McNaught and Markey interests. Arnold became 50% owner of the newly formed Comic Magazines, Inc., the corporate entity that would publish the Quality Comics line. That year Quality released Smash Comics #1 (Aug. 1939), the company's first comic book with exclusively new material.

Initially buying features from Eisner & Iger, a prominent "packager" that produced comics on demand for publishers entering the new medium, Quality introduced such superheroes as Plastic Man and Kid Eternity, and non-superhero characters including the aviator hero Blackhawk. Quality also published comic-book reprints of Will Eisner's "The Spirit", the seven-page lead feature in a weekly 16-page, tabloid-sized, newsprint comic book, known colloquially as "The Spirit Section", distributed through Sunday newspapers.

The name Quality Comics debuted on the cover of Crack Comics #5 (Sept. 1940; see at right). "Seemingly never an official publishing title," the Connecticut Historical Society noted, "the Quality Comics Group is a trademarked name (presumably taking its name from Stamford's nickname of 'the Quality City') encompassing Comic Favorites Inc., E.M. Arnold Publications, Smash Comics, and any other imprints owned by Arnold". A 1954 federal document noted that the Quality Romance Group, owned by Everett M. and Claire C. Arnold, with an office at 347 Madison Avenue, in New York City, published two titles as Arnold Publications, Inc., two titles as Comic Favorites, Inc., and 14 titles as Comic Magazines, Inc.

By the mid-1950s, with television and paperback books drawing readers away from comic books in general and superheroes in particular, interest in Quality's characters had declined considerably. After a foray into other genres such as war, humor, romance and horror, the company ceased operations with comics cover-dated December 1956.

Continuation of characters at other publishers
Many of Quality's character and title trademarks were sold to National Comics Publications (now DC Comics), which chose to keep only four series running: Blackhawk, G.I. Combat, Heart Throbs (each for another 100 or more issues), and Robin Hood Tales (for 8 issues). 

There has been much confusion over whether the original Quality Comics and/or the characters they published are in public domain. The original copyrights for Quality's publications have never been renewed by either Arnold or DC (as no such renewal is on file with the Library of Congress), leaving those original stories in the public domain. The trademarks to the characters, and to the titles of the various comic book series, however, were sold to DC in late 1956, which has periodically published stories with them in order to keep their claims alive.

Over the decades, DC revived other Quality characters. Plastic Man has starred in several short-lived series starting in 1966, as well as a Saturday morning cartoon from 1979–1981. The character went on to become a member of the Justice League in the 1990s.

According to DC canon, the Quality characters, before the 1985-1986 DC revamping event called Crisis on Infinite Earths, existed on two separate realities in the DC Multiverse: Earth-Quality and Earth-X. While Earth-Quality followed much the same history as the main Earths, Earth-X was radically different from most Earths, in that World War II continued there until 1973, enabling the Freedom Fighters to continue their fight against the Nazis. Crisis on Infinite Earths #11 established a new "Post-Crisis" continuity in which the Quality and other DC characters have instead always lived on the single, unified DC Earth.

New, successor versions of the characters Black Condor and The Ray were introduced in 1992. Both were recruited into the Justice League. The new Ray had his own 1994–1996 series and occasionally appears as a reserve Justice League member.

Some Quality Comics titles, including Blackhawk and Plastic Man, have been reprinted by DC, while lesser-known ones have been reprinted by AC Comics.

Characters/features

#711
Alias the Spider
Atomictot
Black Condor
Blackhawk
Blue Tracer
Bozo the Iron Man
Captain Triumph
The Clock
Destiny
Doll Man
Espionage
Firebrand
Ghost of Flanders
The Human Bomb
Invisible Hood
Jester
Kid Eternity
Lady Luck
Madame Fatal

Magno the Magnetic Man
Manhunter
Merlin the Magician
Midnight
Miss America
Mouthpiece
Neon the Unknown
Phantom Lady
Plastic Man
Quicksilver (later DC's Max Mercury)
Raven
Ray
The Red Bee
Red Torpedo
Spider Widow
the Spirit (1st Quality Comics & comic book appr. Police Comics #11)
Stormy Foster
Torchy
Uncle Sam
Wildfire
Wonder Boy

List of titles published by Quality Comics
Quality published comics from 1939 to 1956.
All Humor Comics #1–17 (1946–1949)
The Barker #1–15 (1946–1949)
Blackhawk #9–107 (1944–1956; formerly Uncle Sam Quarterly #1–8; Blackhawk #108–273 subsequently published by DC Comics, 1957–1983)
Bride's Romance #1–23 (1953–1956)
Broadway Romances #1–5 (1950)
Buccaneers #19–27 (1950–1951; formerly Kid Eternity #1–18)
Buster Bear #1–10 (1953–1955)
Campus Loves #1–5 (1949–1950)
Candy #1–64 (1947–1956)
Crack Comics #1–62 (1940–1949; Crack Comics[Ashcan] #1)Crack Western #63–84 (1949–1953; formerly Crack Comics #1–62; Jonesy #85(1) 2-8)Diary Loves #2–31 (1949–1953; formerly Love Diary #1; G.I. Sweethearts #32-45 Girls in Love #46-57)Doll Man #1–47 (1941–1953)Egbert #1-20 (1946–1950)Exotic Romances #22–31 (1955–1956; formerly True War Romances #1–21)
Exploits of Daniel Boone #1–6 (1955–1956)
Feature Funnies #1–20 (1937–1939); Feature Comics #21-144 (1939–1950)
Flaming Love #1–6 (1949–1950)
Forbidden Love #1–4 (1950)
Gabby #11; issue numbering restarts, #2–9 (1953–1954; formerly Ken Shannon #1-10)
G.I. Combat #1–43 (1952–1956; #44-288 subsequently published by DC Comics, 1957–1987)
G.I. Sweethearts #32–45 (1953–1955; formerly Diary Loves #2–31; #46 onward Girls in Love #46-57)
Girls in Love #46–57 (1955–1956; formerly G.I. Sweethearts #32–45)
Heart Throbs #1–46 (1949; #47–146 subsequently published by DC Comics, 1957–1972; retitled Love Stories, #147–152, 1972–1973)
Hickory #1-6 (1949–1950)
Hit Comics #1–65 (1940–1950)
Hollywood Diary #1–5 (1949–1950)
Hollywood Secrets #1–6 (1949–1950)
Intrigue #1 (1955)
Jonesy #85; issue numbering restarts, 2–8 (1953–1954; formerly Crack Western #1–84)
Ken Shannon #1–10 (1951–1953; Gabby #11 onward)
Kid Eternity #1–18 (1946–1949; Buccaneers #19 onward)
Lady Luck #86–90 (1949–1950; formerly Smash Comics #1–85)
Love Confessions #1–54 (1949–1956)
Love Diary #1 (1949; Diary Loves #2 onward)
Love Letters #1–51 (1949–1956)
Love Scandals #1–5 (1950)
Love Secrets #32–56 (1953–1956)
Marmaduke Mouse #1–65 (1946–1956)
Military Comics #1–43 (1941–1945; Modern Comics #44 onward)
Modern Comics #44–102 (1945–1950; previously Military Comics #1–43)
National Comics #1–75 (1940–1949)
Plastic Man #1–64 (1943–1956)
Police Comics #1–127 (1941–1953)
Range Romances #1–5 (1949–1950)
Robin Hood Tales #1–6 (1956; #7–14 subsequently published by DC Comics, 1957–1958)
Secret Loves #1–6 (1949–1950)
Smash Comics #1–85 (1939–1949; Lady Luck #86 onward)
The Spirit #1–22 (1944–1950)
T-Man #1–38 (1951–1956)
Torchy 1–6 (1949–1950)
True War Romances #1–21 (1952–1955; Exotic Romances #22 onward)
Uncle Sam Quarterly #1–8 (1941–1943; Blackhawk #9 onward)
Untamed Love #1–5 (1950)
Web of Evil #1–21 (1952–1954)
Wedding Bells #1–19 (1954–1956)
Yanks in Battle #1–4 (1956)

See also
Everett M. "Busy" Arnold
Eisner & Iger
Infinite Crisis

References

References

External links
Archive of  "Quality Comic Group: A Brief History" at the Connecticut Historical Society. Original page.
Quality's Superheroes & Villains Encyclopedia

 
DC Comics imprints
Defunct comics and manga publishing companies
Comic book publishing companies of the United States
1937 establishments in New York City
Publishing companies established in 1937
Quality Comics
Companies based in New York City